Count Dracula is a British television adaptation of the 1897 novel Dracula by Bram Stoker. Produced by the BBC (in the then standard video/film hybrid format), it first aired on BBC 2 on 22 December 1977. It is among the more faithful of the many adaptations of the original book. Directed by Philip Saville from a screenplay by Gerald Savory, it stars Louis Jourdan as Count Dracula and Frank Finlay as Professor Van Helsing.

Plot 

Lucy Westenra's sister Mina bids farewell to her fiancé Jonathan Harker, who is leaving for a business trip. Harker, a solicitor, is travelling to Count Dracula's castle in Transylvania to expedite his purchase of Carfax Abbey and other properties in England.

On the penultimate leg of Harker's trip, in a horse-drawn coach with three locals, one warns him not to attend Dracula's castle. Harker tells the woman not to worry, but she gives him her rosary for protection as a precaution. Harker is dropped off at the Borgo Pass in the dead of night with wolves howling in the distance, and is picked up a few moments later by the Count's coach. At the castle's door, Count Dracula welcomes Jonathan and carries his heavy trunk, with no effort, up the stairs to his room. Jonathan hesitantly agrees to stay for a month to help the Count with his English. Dracula is urbane and gracious, but also vaguely sinister; he casts no reflection, and has pronouncedly sharp fingernails and hair on his palms. After a series of disturbing events, including an encounter with Dracula's brides, Harker explores the castle, finds the Count and his brides' sleeping quarters in a crypt, all asleep in coffins with their eyes open yet seemingly unaware of his presence. Harker tries ineffectually to kill Dracula with a shovel before fleeing the castle.

In England, Mina and Lucy go to the seaside town of Whitby. Among their friends are Quincey Holmwood (Lucy's American fiancé), and Dr. John Seward, who operates a local asylum. Among Seward's patients is the madman Renfield, who worships and fears Dracula. Mina and Lucy witness a storm in which the foreign ship Demeter goes aground, and is carrying Dracula (in the form of a wolf) and many wooden boxes filled with earth from his home. That same night, a local seaman is found dead, a victim of Dracula. Mina follows a sleepwalking Lucy to the local graveyard and glimpses Dracula holding her in his arms. Lucy thereafter grows pale and weak; at night in her bedroom, Dracula drinks her blood on several occasions. Jonathan, meanwhile, turns up delirious and weak in a convent in Budapest.

Seward calls on his friend Abraham Van Helsing from Amsterdam for help with Lucy's strange illness. Although Van Helsing recognizes the symptoms and protects her bedroom with garlic, a wolf shatters the room's window; the shock kills Lucy's mother, and Lucy is found pale and nearly dead after another encounter with Dracula. Despite Van Helsing's efforts, she soon dies, but not before displaying signs of vampirism, such as a missing reflection and an uncharacteristic seductiveness and aggression when Holmwood comes to see her in her final moments.

Seward accompanies Van Helsing to Lucy's grave, but find her coffin empty, and afterwards a child who is lost and alone, but who has been bitten by the now-vampiric Lucy. After reporting their findings to an incredulous Holmwood, he and Van Helsing and Seward return to Lucy's family crypt, finding her perched atop. Lucy soon approaches, now a vampire and feral, and attempts to entice Holmwood, but is forced to flee from Van Helsing's crucifix. Later in the tomb, Holmwood drives a wooden stake into Lucy's heart. Van Helsing fills her mouth with garlic and cuts off her head.

Harker, Van Helsing, Seward, and Holmwood all go to Carfax Abbey to sterilize Dracula's refuges – boxes of soil from his native Transylvania – with parts of the host used in the Eucharist. Renfield realizes Dracula is now visiting Mina, and seeks to warn her and Seward. An enraged Dracula kills Renfield, who just manages to warn the others. They rush to find Mina in her bedroom, drinking blood from Dracula's chest. Dracula vanishes as they enter. Van Helsing touches and sears the hysterical Mina's forehead with a piece of a host, which scars her; she declares herself "unclean".

The Count flees back to his castle after losing all his other resting places; the others follow. Van Helsing and Mina go to the castle, while the others follow the Gypsies transporting Dracula's coffin. In the Transylvanian wilderness, Dracula's brides attempt to attack Van Helsing and Mina, but Van Helsing thwarts them with the host, and destroys them the following day. Harker, Seward, and Holmwood chase Dracula's carriage and fight the gypsies loyal to Dracula; Mina shoots one, saving Harker, but Holmwood is fatally wounded. The pursuers reach and open the coffin; inside, Dracula smiles because it is almost sunset. Realizing they have only moments left, Van Helsing mounts the carriage and drives a stake into the vampire's heart; the body disintegrates in a violent burst of smoke, leaving only his clothes and ashes. Mina's vampirism disappears, as does her forehead scar, and the group say a prayer of thanks.

Cast 
 Louis Jourdan as Count Dracula
 Frank Finlay as Professor Van Helsing
 Susan Penhaligon as Lucy Westenra
 Judi Bowker as Mina Westenra
 Jack Shepherd as Renfield
 Mark Burns as Dr. John Seward
 Bosco Hogan as Jonathan Harker
 Richard Barnes as Quincey P. Holmwood
 Ann Queensberry as Mrs Westenra
 Sue Vanner, Susie Hickford and Belinda Meuldijk as Dracula's Brides
 Adam Diamant as the baby that gets eaten in an early scene.

Production
Louis Jourdan said of playing Dracula in interview, "What is so interesting in playing Dracula is that I try to make monstrosity, or, if you prefer, villainy, attractive, very attractive. If we succeed in that we have won our day. If the audience can be troubled enough to say that maybe Dracula is right in what he says, then we have won... He is an angel, a fallen angel. I think Dracula should be played as an extremely kind person, who truly believes he is doing good. He gives eternal life. He takes blood and he gives blood. Therefore, he gives an exchange which is symbolic of love and the sexual act, such as in the scene we were just doing [in which Dracula gives his blood to Mina Harker]."

Transmission history
Count Dracula was originally shown on BBC 2 in the UK in its entirety (155 minutes) on 22 December 1977. It was repeated twice in 1979, the first time on BBC 2 in January and again on BBC 1 in December. On both of these occasions it was split into three episodes and shown on three consecutive nights. It was repeated again on BBC 2 in April 1993 when it was shown in two parts.

In the United States, Count Dracula was shown as part of PBS's Great Performances anthology series in three parts starting March 1, 1978 and later on Halloween, October 31, 1979.

Reception
Critical reaction to Count Dracula has been mostly positive. Writing in The Guardian, TV critic Nancy Banks-Smith stated it was "A nice plushy production with much galloping off in all directions and sulphurous smoke effects, a pleasant sensation of space and time and money. Something of a hole in the middle though, like a vampire after remedial treatment." She was less positive about the casting and performance of Louis Jourdan, however, which she felt "emphasised the lover at the expense of the demon. It makes a change. Though, I would say, for the worst."

Film historian Stuart Galbraith IV said that "Count Dracula remains one of the best-ever adaptations of Bram Stoker's novel" despite a "couple of missteps", remarking that "the cast is excellent", in particular praising the performances of Frank Finlay and Louis Jourdan, whom he calls "especially good." Critic Steve Calvert agreed that Count Dracula was "one of the better versions" of Stoker's novel, calling it "perhaps even the best." He felt that "few actors have ever played the role [of Van Helsing as] convincingly" as Frank Finlay, that "without doubt, [Jack Shepherd is] the best on-screen embodiment there has ever been of the fly-munching Renfield", and remarked of  Jourdan's performance, "[His] Dracula ... exudes a quieter kind of evil. A calculating, educated evil with a confidence and purpose all of its own."

In his book Hollywood Gothic: The Tangled Web of Dracula from Novel to Stage to Screen, David J. Skal calls Count Dracula "the most careful adaptation of the novel to date, and the most successful." Brett Cullum of DVD Verdict said the special effects were this version's "biggest downfall" and that it was "perhaps the least visually interesting" Dracula adaptation, though he offered a mostly positive review, remarking that there is "plenty to admire in the production", in particular the "sublime acting". MaryAnn Johanson of FlickFilosopher.com was less positive, writing: "Maybe it had more of an impact in the 70s ... but today, while it remains a stylishly surreal reinterpretation of Bram Stoker’s novel, there’s something a bit dated and stodgy about it".

Home video
In 2002, BBC Learning released Count Dracula on DVD, for sale by direct mail order in the UK only. 
It was released commercially by BBC Video in 2007.

See also
 Vampire films

References

External links 
 
 
 Online Review
 Another Online Review

Dracula films
Dracula television shows
Films based on horror novels
British television films
British vampire films
1977 television films
1977 films
British horror films
1977 horror films
American horror television films
Films directed by Philip Saville
Films based on works by Bram Stoker
Films set in castles
Films set in Transylvania
Films set in Whitby
1970s English-language films
1970s American films
1970s British films